The 11th congressional district of Illinois is represented by Democrat Bill Foster.

Geographic boundaries

2011 redistricting
From 1865 to 1867, the district included Bureau, LaSalle, Livingston and Woodford counties. From 1901 until 1947 the 11th congressional district included Kane, DuPage, McHenry and Will Counties. Following the Congressional Apportionment Act of 1947, the district covered a portion of Cook County and the far northwest side of Chicago roughly centered on Norwood Park. The district was not changed by 1951's redistricting. In 1961, the district was widened westward to the Des Plaines River and east into parts of Lincoln Square. The district covered the northwest side of Chicago until the early 1990s when it moved closer to its current area, encompassing most of LaSalle and Grundy Counties, the southern part of Will County, the northern part of Kankakee County and a small portion of southeastern Cook County along the Indiana state line. The Illinois Congressional Reapportionment Act of 2001 (10 ILCS 76) defined its boundaries following the U.S. Census 2000.

Following the U.S. Census 2010 the district includes Joliet in Will County, parts of Naperville in southern DuPage County, and Aurora in Kane County.  It includes the Argonne National Laboratory. The congressional district covers parts of Cook, Du Page, Kane, Kendall and Will counties, as of the 2011 redistricting which followed the 2010 census. All or parts of Aurora, Bolingbrook, Darien, Joliet, Montgomery, Naperville, Lisle, Downers Grove, New Lenox, Shorewood and Woodridge are included. The representatives for these districts were elected in the 2012 primary and general elections, and the boundaries became effective on January 3, 2013.

2021 redistricting

As of the 2020 redistricting, this district will shift to cover the Northern Illinois region, encompassing most of McHenry and Kane Counties, parts of Boone, Lake, DeKalb, DuPage, Cook, and Will Counties.

Lake County is split between this district, the 9th district, and the 10th district. They are partitioned by Volo Bog State Natural Area, W Brandenburg Rd, N US Highway 12, W Townline Rd, N Wilson Rd, W Chardon Rd, N Fairfield Rd, W Ivanhoe Rd, Liberty St, High St, Kimball Ave, E Liberty St, S Church St, Bangs St, W Liberty St, Westridge Dr/N Lakeview Cir, Carriage Hill Ct/Wood Creek Dr, Greenleaf Ave, Ridge Rd/Burr Oak Ln, and E Burnett Rd/Northern Ter. The 11th district takes in half of the municipalities of Wauconda and Island Lake.

McHenry County is split between this district, the 10th district, the 16th district, and the 9th district. The 11th and 10th districts are partitioned by Lily Lake Drain, W Rand Rd, Fox River, N Riverside Dr, Illinois Highway 31, Petersen Farm, Dutch Creek, McCullom Lake Rd, White Oak Ln, McCullom Lake, W Shore Dr, W Martin Rd, Bennington Ln, N Martin Rd, N Curran Rd, Old Draper Rd, Farmstead Dr, S Ridge Rd, N Valley Hill Rd, Barber Creek, Wonder Lake, Illinois Highway 120, Thompson Rd, and Slough Creek. The 11th and 16th districts are partitioned by Nelson Rd, Slough Creek, Hartland Rd, and Tomlin Rd. The 11th and 9th districts are partitioned by E Crystal Lake Ave, Meridian Ln, Crystal Lake Country Club, Woodscreek Park, Boulder Ridge Country Club, and Fairway View Dr. The 11th district takes in the municipalities of Woodstock and Marengo; most of McHenry; and half of Crystal Lake and Huntley; and part of Port Barrington, Lake in the Hills, and Oakwood Hills.

Boone County is split between this district and the 16th district. They are partitioned by Orth Rd, Poplar Grove Rd, Woodstock Rd, McKinley Ave, Squaw Prairie Rd, Beloit Rd, Illinois Business Route 20, Kishwaukee River, Wynwood Dr, N Appleton Rd, S Appleton Rd, Illinois Highway 5, and Stone Quarry Rd. The 11th district takes in half of the municipality of Belvidere.

DeKalb County is split between this district, the 14th district, and the 16th district. They are partitioned by Myelle Rd, Bass Line Rd, Illinois Highway 23, Whipple Rd, Plank Rd, Swanson Rd, and Darnell Rd. The 11th district takes in the municipalities of Genoa and Kingston.

Kane County is split between this district and the 8th district. The 11th and 8th districts are partitioned by Illinois Highway 47, Regency Parkway, Farm Hill Dr, Del Webb Blvd, Jane Adams Memorial Tollway, Sandwald Rd, Ridgecrest Dr, Brier Hill Rd/Illinois Highway 47, Coombs Rd, Shadow Hill Dr, Campton Hills Dr, West Main St, South Tyler Rd, Division St, Fox River, North Washington Ave, Douglas Rd, Orion Rd, and East Fabyan Parkway. The 11th and 14th districts are partitioned by Lasher Rd, Illinois Highway 83, Jericho Rd, Arnold Ave, Rathbone Ave, Fox River, and New York St. The 11th district takes in the municipalities of North Aurora, Batavia, and Hampshire; most of Geneva west of the Fox River; and half of St. Charles and Aurora.

DuPage County is split between this district, the 6th district, and the 3rd district. The 11th, 3rd, and 6th districts are partitioned by Grand Ave, Highway 83, Central Ave, Fullerton Ave, Harvard Ave, Armitage Ave, Addison Rd, Highway 64, Westmore Ave, Plymouth St, Westwood Ave, Highway 355, Union Pacific Railroad, North Path, President St, Naperville Rd, Highway 23, Danada Ct, Arrowhead Golf Club, Herrick Rd, Galosh Ave, Butterfield Rd, Calumet Ave E, and Prairie Ave. The 11th district takes in the municipalities of Naperville; most of Woodridge; and part of Darien.

Cook County is split between this district and the 1st district. The 11th and 1st districts are partitioned by W Roberta Dr, Walter St, W 127th St, Glenys Dr/Norwalk Rd, Glenys Dr/Keepataw Dr, Hillview Dr, Woodglen Ln/Berkeley Ln, Country Ln/Auburn Rd, 6th St/Kromray Rd, 119th St, Mt Vernon Memorial Estates, and McCarthy Rd. The 11th district takes in half the municipality of Lemont.

Will County is split between this district and the 14th district. They are partitioned by Modaff Rd, Knoch Knolls Park, S Knight Rd, Kings Rd, Remington Blvd, The Links at Carillon, N Weber Rd, W Normantown Rd, Romeoville Prairie Nature Preserve, and the Chicago Sanitary and Ship Canal. The 11th district takes in the municipalities of Bolingbrook, and half of Romeoville.

Recent statewide election results

Elections

2012

2014

2016

2018

2020

2022

List of members representing the district

Historical maps of boundaries

See also 

Illinois's congressional districts
List of United States congressional districts

References 

 Congressional Biographical Directory of the United States 1774–present

External links 
2002 Census of Agriculture – 11th Congressional District Profile
District map
Congressional district profiles
Washington Post page on the 11th District of Illinois
U.S. Census Bureau – 11th District Fact Sheet
Maps
Illinois Districts in 1903. (1901 to 1947)
Illinois Districts following the Congressional Apportionment Act of 1947.
Illinois Districts following the Congressional Apportionment Act of 1951.
Illinois Districts following the Congressional Apportionment Act of 1961.

11
Will County, Illinois
Kankakee County, Illinois
Grundy County, Illinois
LaSalle County, Illinois
Bureau County, Illinois
Woodford County, Illinois
McLean County, Illinois
Constituencies established in 1863
1863 establishments in Illinois